World Endurance Championship may refer to:

 FIA World Endurance Championship, an auto racing series held since 2012
 World Sportscar Championship, an auto racing series which used the title World Endurance Championship from 1981 to 1985
 Endurance FIM World Championship, a motorcycle racing series since 1975
 World Enduro Championship, an off-road motorcycle racing series since 1990